Bridge Constructor is a series of physics-based simulation-puzzle video games developed by ClockStone and published by Headup Games. While themes and elements change across the series, each game is based on planning out a bridge across a river or ravine using a number of parts, limited by the geometry of the space and the total cost of the parts. The goal for each scenario is to make sure that one or more vehicles driving across the bridge can reach the other side safely.

History

The first Bridge Construct game was Pontifex and later Pontifex 2, in 2001.

The second Bridge Constructor game, eponymous to the series, was released for Microsoft Windows on 1 December 2011. While it was generally successful in Europe and topped the app charts there, it didn't really catch on in North America until after a Reddit post by a player of the game within the "GamePhysics" subforum in March 2014. The post showed a GIF-image of a truck just making it across a bridge as it was collapsing underneath it. This created a large interest in the title, resulting it being the top paid iOS within 10 days of the image's posting. Headup Games took initiative to offer sales on the game and cross-promote the other titles in the series.  With the boost in North America, the game saw over 27 million free and paid downloads, and a "good seven-digit figure" in paid sales by March 2014, according to Gregor Ebert of Headup Games.

Games

Bridge Constructor (2011)

Bridge Constructor Playground (2012)

Bridge Constructor Medieval (2013)

Bridge Constructor Stunts (2015)

Bridge Constructor Portal (2017)

Bridge Constructor Portal was announced in December 2017, for release on mobile and personal computers later that same month, and for consoles in 2018. Developed under license from Valve, the game sets challenges in the Aperture Laboratory facilities from the Portal series, under the watchful eye of the artificial intelligence GLaDOS. The game uses the same core gameplay of earlier titles, but with elements from the Portal series, such as the portals, turrets, and other features.

Bridge Constructor: The Walking Dead (2020)
Bridge Constructor: The Walking Dead was announced in August 2020 at Gamescom and released on 19 November 2020.

References

2011 video games
Android (operating system) games
Bridges in fiction
IOS games
Puzzle video games
Simulation video games
Video game franchises introduced in 2011
Video games developed in Austria